The Americas Zone was one of the three regional zones of the 1986 Davis Cup.

9 teams entered the Americas Zone in total, with the winner promoted to the following year's World Group. Argentina defeated Chile in the final and qualified for the 1987 World Group.

Participating nations

Draw

First round

Venezuela vs. Uruguay

Quarterfinals

Chile vs. Canada

Caribbean/West Indies vs. Brazil

Colombia vs. Peru

Argentina vs. Uruguay

Semifinals

Brazil vs. Chile

Argentina vs. Peru

Final

Chile vs. Argentina

References

External links
Davis Cup official website

Davis Cup Americas Zone
Americas